Discovery Day is the name of several holidays commemorating the discovery of land, gold, and other significant national discoveries.

The Bahamas
The Bahamas Discovery Day was a public holiday on October 12, that celebrated the arrival of Christopher Columbus in the New World in 1492. It coincided with the Columbus Day celebrations of many other countries in the Americas. Columbus's initial landfall was on the now-unknown island of Guanahani in the Bahamas in 1492.

It was last observed as a holiday in 2012 and has been replaced by National Heroes Day holiday, which is a public holiday observed on the second Monday in October.

Brazil
In Brazil, Discovery Day is observed on April 22 each year. This date commemorates the day when Pedro Álvares Cabral became the first European to land in Brazil in 1500 (although this discovery is contested by some).

Canada

In Yukon, Discovery Day is a public holiday on the third Monday in August commemorating the anniversary of the discovery of gold in 1896, which started the Klondike Gold Rush.

In Newfoundland and Labrador, it is observed on the Monday nearest June 24 and commemorates John Cabot's discovery of Newfoundland in 1497. In June 2020, it was announced that the name of the holiday would be changed in consultation with Indigenous groups in the province.

Cayman Islands
Discovery Day in the Cayman Islands commemorates the discovery of the Sister Islands of Cayman Brac and Little Cayman by Christopher Columbus in 1503. The public holiday is celebrated on the third Monday in May.

Guam
March 6 marks the day in 1521 that Magellan's expedition dropped anchor in Umatac Bay.

Hispaniola
December 5, the date in 1492 when Christopher Columbus landed on the island of Hispaniola in what is now Môle-Saint-Nicolas, Haiti, is called Discovery Day. Today the island is shared by two countries: Haiti and the Dominican Republic which both recognize the holiday.

Puerto Rico

November 19, the date in 1493 when Columbus landed on the island is an official holiday. Not to be confused with Columbus Day, which is celebrated on the 2nd Monday of October in the United States, including Puerto Rico.

References

March observances
April observances
May observances
June observances
August observances
October observances
December observances
Public holidays in Canada
Types of secular holidays
Holidays and observances by scheduling (nth weekday of the month)